Wayne Black and Kevin Ullyett were the defending champions, but lost in second round to Mario Ančić and Ivan Ljubičić.

Jonas Björkman and Max Mirnyi won the title, defeating Michaël Llodra and Fabrice Santoro 4–6, 7–6(7–2), 7–6(7–3) in the final.

Seeds
All seeds received a bye into the second round.

Draw

Finals

Top half

Bottom half

External links
 Main Draw

Doubles